The 2022 United States House of Representatives election in the United States Virgin Islands was held on Tuesday, November 8, 2022, to elect the non-voting Delegate to the United States House of Representatives from the United States Virgin Islands' at-large congressional district. The election coincided with the larger 2022 United States House of Representatives elections and the general election in the United States Virgin Islands.

The U.S. Virgin Island's non-voting delegate is elected for a two-year term in office. Incumbent delegate Stacey Plaskett, a Democrat who was first elected in 2014, and most recently re-elected with 88.1% of the vote in 2020, won re-election to a fifth term.

Candidates

Nominee

Democratic Party
Stacey Plaskett, incumbent Delegate first elected in 2014.

References

2022
United States Virgin Islands
United States House of Representatives